Maxwell Shane (August 26, 1905 – October 25, 1983) was an American movie and television director, screenwriter, and producer.

Biography
Before embarking in a career in show business, Shane studied law at USC and UCLA law schools. He later became a journalist and moved on to become a Hollywood publicist. Along with David Hillman (father of musician Chris Hillman), he founded the Hillman-Shane Advertising Agency, in Los Angeles. Shane later became a screenwriter. Most of his early work was for forgettable low-budget films. Becoming a director in 1947, he worked on noirish films, as a writer or director, like Hell's Island, Fear in the Night and the remake Nightmare. Shane scripted City Across the River, the 1949 film of Irving Shulman's The Amboy Dukes, and directed 1955's The Naked Street, starring Anthony Quinn and Anne Bancroft.

In 1960, he became a writer-producer for the Boris Karloff anthology television series Thriller.

Awards

References

External links
 

1905 births
1983 deaths
Writers from Paterson, New Jersey
UCLA School of Law alumni
USC Gould School of Law alumni
American male screenwriters
American television directors
Film producers from New Jersey
20th-century American businesspeople
Film directors from New Jersey
Screenwriters from New Jersey
20th-century American male writers
20th-century American screenwriters
Television producers from New Jersey